Félix Joseph Henri de Lacaze-Duthiers (15 May 1821 – 21 July 1901) was a French biologist, anatomist and zoologist born in Montpezat  in the department of Lot-et-Garonne. He was a leading authority in the field of malacology.

He studied medicine in Paris, and worked at Necker Hospital under Armand Trousseau (1801–1867). Later on, with Jules Haime (1824–1856), he travelled to the Balearic Islands to study marine life. In 1854 he returned to Paris as an assistant to Henri Milne-Edwards (1800–1885), and soon afterwards became a professor of zoology in Lille.

In 1865 he succeeded Achille Valenciennes (1794–1865) as chair of histoire naturelle des mollusques, des vers et des zoophytes at the National Museum of Natural History, France, and in 1868 became a professor at the University of Paris. In 1871 he was elected to French Academy of Sciences in the department of anatomy and zoology.

Lacaze-Duthiers is remembered for his study of the anatomy and developmental history of mussels, coral, snails, brachiopods and other invertebrate marine animals. In 1858 he discovered three mollusks in the Mediterranean that produced purple-blue dyes. One of the species, named murex trunculus, was the source of the distinctive purple-blue dye used by the ancient Phoenicians and Canaanites.  He realised the dying process could be used to create a photographic image in purple-blue dye which he named the Mucographé process.  Examples are preserved in the Sorbonne and the Royal Society in London.

He conducted pioneer exploration of marine life of coastal Algeria, that included scientific studies of coral. A result of this research was the publication of "Histoire naturelle du corail" (1864).

He was the founder of two laboratories devoted to marine biology; the biological station at Roscoff in 1876, and the Arago laboratory at Banyuls-sur-Mer in 1882. A number of species bear his name, a few of them being: Strophomenia lacazei, Convoluta lacazi and Dileptus lacazei. In 1872 he founded the journal "Archives de zoologie expérimentale et générale" (Archives of Experimental and General Zoology).

References
 This article incorporates translated text from equivalent articles at the German and French Wikipedia, whose references include: Philippe & Edward R. Jaussaud Brygoo (2004). Museum in the Garden From 516 biographies . National Museum of Natural History in Paris: 630 p.

Further reading

 

1821 births
1901 deaths
French anatomists
French zoologists
French malacologists
Academic staff of the Lille University of Science and Technology
Foreign Members of the Royal Society
Foreign associates of the National Academy of Sciences
Members of the French Academy of Sciences
National Museum of Natural History (France) people
Members of the Royal Society of Sciences in Uppsala